Reinaldo Ricardo Lopez Cabello, known as Pachy Lopez (August 11, 1968), was born in Havana, Cuba. He is a songwriter in the Latin market.

Early life 
Reinaldo Ricardo Lopez Cabello was born in Havana, Cuba. He is the son of Reinaldo Lopez, a percussionist, and Norma A. Cabello, a club singer in the Havana highlife club scene of the 60s and 70s. At the age of eight, he began his musical studies, choosing the guitar as his favorite instrument.

At age fourteen, influenced by family tradition, his aunts and cousins introduced him to the world of theater. He later became an actor/writer, winning awards as the youngest writer of the industry. These awards set him up to travel to the National Theater of Panama in 1988 for a presentation, where he defected the Cuban regime. Lopez arrived in Miami, Florida in 1990 and established residence where he now lives with his family.

Career 
In the early nineties, Lopez worked as a freelance writer and published his first radio hit "Romanticos al Rescate"  sang by Latin Star Luis Enrique (singer). Many other hits such as Amor de Novela,  El Rey Del Mundo,  Estas Hecha Para Mi,  Romanticos al Rescate,  Si Quieres Amar  and Nada es Igual Sin Ti  were created during his relationship with Sony which owns part of his catalog until this day.

In 1997, he graduated from F.I.U. with a Bachelor of Science in Communication and decided to follow his writing career by founding Artistik Connection Music Publishing. The company later signed a co-publishing agreement with PEER MUSIC PUBLISHING. During his contractual relationship with PEER, he developed a catalog of 184 songs and published several songs recorded by notable artists such as, Rey Ruiz, Víctor Manuelle, Alejandra Guzmán, Yuri, Jaime Camil, and Willy Chirino.

In 2003 he founded Red Door Productions, Inc,  an event production and marketing firm servicing the entertainment and event industry in the South Florida area and retired from his music writing career.

Lopez was also a photographer and in 2007, he received the International Library of Photography award as one of the best photographers. His images have been used in the entertainment industry for advertising campaigns, concert promotions, TV ads, billboards, internet campaigns and three published books by the International Library of Photography.

Discography 
 1993 Alvaro Torres-  Te Llevo Dentro [] 
 1993 Lourdes Robles-  Se Te Nota [] 
 1994 Luis Enrique-  Románticos Al Rescate [] 
 1994 Victor Manuel-  Te LLevo Dentro [] 
 1995 Jerry Rivera-  Amor Magico [] 
 1995 Rafael Armando-  Un Beso De Quien Amas [] 
 1995 Rey Ruiz-  El Rey Del Mundo [] 
 1996 Angel Joel-  Atracción, Estas Hecha Para Mi
 1996 Jomar-  Fuera De Lo Comun, Esta Hecha Para Mi [] 
 1996 Rey Ruiz-  Saber Amar [] 
 1997 Lucrecia-  No Me Hacen Falta Alas [] 
 1997 Giro-  Una Historia De Amor [] 
 1998 Servando y Florentino-  Estas Hecha Para Mi [] 
 1998 Miguel Angel Guerra-  Orar En La Mañana
 1998 Fabby-  Te Amo [] 
 1998 Liliana-  Comenzar De Cero [] 
 1998 Lourdes Robles-  Si Pudieras Amarme [] 
 1998 Alejandro Martinez-  Dime Si Es Amor, Escápate Conmigo [] 
 1998 Jailene-  Que Tu Fe Nunca Muera [] 
 1998 Jerry Rivera-  Si Quieres Amar [] 
 1998 Onda Vaselina-  Desconéctate [] 
 1999 Charlie Cruz-  Grito Tu Nombre [] 
 1999 Yolandita Monge-  Vibraciones Positivas [] 
 1999 Amparo Sandino-  Asi Es Mi Gente, Si Yo Pudiera [] 
 1999 Marcelo Cano-  Angeles
 1999 Alejandra Guzmán-  Grita [] 
 1999 Los Grana-  Si Quieres Amar [] 
 1999 Luis Enrique-  Y Soñar [] 
 2000 Juan Carlos Coronel-  Edad Madura
 2000 Miguel Angel Guerra-  Fe
 2000 Los Hidalgo-  Si Pudieras Amarme, Dime Que Si [] 
 2000 Jerry Rivera-  Amor De Novela [] 
 2000 Jaime Camil-  Nada Es Igual Sin Ti, Fiesta De Amor, Me Llego El Amor, Si Quieres Amar [] 
 2000 Jerry Rivera-  Navegándote [] 
 2001 Daniela Luján-  Vuela Alto [] 
 2001 Jerry Rivera-  Volveras, Un Beso De Quien Amas [] 
 2001 Yuri-  Que Tu Fe Nunca Muera [] 
 2004 Willy Chirino-  Solo Por Amor, Veneno[] 
 2021 Gente De Zona- Vampiro
 2021 Marc Anthony- Si Fuera Facil

References

External links 
 https://web.archive.org/web/20090719022721/http://pachylopez.com/
 https://www.evibe.in
 http://www.peermusic.com/artistpage/Reinaldo_Pachy_Lopez.html

Cuban songwriters
Male songwriters
Living people
Year of birth missing (living people)